Cymopterus ripleyi is a species of flowering plant in the carrot family known by the common name Ripley's springparsley, or Ripley's cymopterus. It is native to Nevada, Arizona and eastern California, where it grows in habitat with sandy soils, such as deserts. It is a stemless perennial herb, producing leaves and inflorescence from the taproot. The shiny, hairless leaves have small, rounded blades with approximately three leaflets each divided into lobes. The leaves are borne on petioles up to 10 centimeters long. The inflorescence is a spherical cluster of purplish or off-white flowers atop a long peduncle.

External links
Jepson Manual Treatment
USDA Plants Profile
Photo gallery

ripleyi
Flora of the California desert regions
Flora of Arizona
Flora of Nevada
Endemic flora of the United States
Plants described in 1941